IniciativaVerds (IV) is a Balearic ecosocialist political party.  IV is a part of the Més per Mallorca coalition. IV supports Equo at the Spanish level.

IV was founded after Iniciativa d'Esquerres (Left-wing Initiative), a split of United Left of the Balearic Islands (EUIB), and The Greens of Majorca merged in November 2010.

References

External links
 Official website of IniciativaVerds 

Green political parties in Spain
Left-wing nationalist parties
Socialist parties in Spain